Siyahvarud (also Romanized as Sīyāhvarūd and SeyāhvaRūd; also known as Sīyāhvarūd (Persian:  سياهورود), SiyāhVarūd, SīyahVarūd, SīāyhVarūd, SīāvehvaRūd, SīyāhVarūd, and Siyahvarud, is a village in Darram Rural District, in the Central District of Tarom County, Zanjan Province, Iran. At the 2006 census, its population was 230, in 36 families.

References 

Populated places in Tarom County